Rosa Maria Gomes de Lima (born 2 May 1964), commonly known as Rosa, is a Brazilian retired footballer who played as a defender for the Brazil women's national football team.

She represented Brazil at the inaugural FIFA Women's World Cup in 1991.

Career
An attacking right–back, de Lima joined EC Radar in 1983 after playing for Eldorado in her native Contagem, then Benfica and Cruzeiro. Later that year she had her jaw broken in a notorious grudge match against Bangu.

In the 1991 FIFA Women's World Cup, de Lima played in all three group games as Brazil were eliminated in the first round. Having moved on to Vasco da Gama, she was one of just two players in the squad who were not contracted to Radar. The 16–year–old Pretinha was the other.

Rosa remained in the national squad for the next campaign at the 1995 South American Women's Football Championship. She was not included in the squad for the 1995 FIFA Women's World Cup.

References

External links
 

1964 births
Living people
1991 FIFA Women's World Cup players
Women's association football defenders
Brazil women's international footballers
Brazilian women's footballers
EC Radar players